"My Only" is a song from Goodnight Nurse's debut studio album, Always and Never. It was released as the fifth single from the album in 2006. It peaked at number 21 on the RIANZ charts in New Zealand.

"My Only" was featured on Electronic Arts's NHL 07 video game.

Track listings
"My Only" - 2:29
"I Would"
"My Only" (Video)

Chart positions

References

2006 singles
Goodnight Nurse songs
Songs written by Joel Little